Iva Grbas (born 29 December 1987 in Rijeka, SFR Yugoslavia) is a Croatian professional basketball player.

External links
Profile at eurobasket.com

1987 births
Living people
Centers (basketball)
Croatian women's basketball players
Power forwards (basketball)
Basketball players from Rijeka
ŽKK Novi Zagreb players